Oh Iboe (Perfected Spelling: Oh Ibu; literally Oh Mother) is a 1938 film from the Dutch East Indies. Directed by The Teng Chun and starring Lo Tjin Nio and Bissu, it followed a suffering of a family after the matriarch dies. The film was one of several produced by The which dealt with modern stories, following Gadis jang Terdjoeal the year before. It is likely lost.

Plot
Tjoa Kim Liong remarries after the death of his wife; his daughter, Loan, does not like her new step-mother. Tjoa becomes increasingly addicted to gambling, devoting all of his time to the habit. His business is surrendered to his Kian Hwat, who uses this newfound power to steal all of Tjoa's wealth. Years later Loan and her fiancé, Goan Hin, are able to recover the funds.

Production
Oh Iboe was directed and produced by The Teng Chun under his production house Java Industrial Film. Beginning with Sam Pek Eng Tay in 1932 they had directed commercially successful films based on Chinese legends. However, following Albert Balink's Pareh (Rice) in 1936 The began directing works with more modern stories which recognised native interests. Oh Iboe was the second such film, following Gadis jang Terdjoeal (The Sold Girl) in 1937. The's brothers also worked on Oh Iboe: The Teng Liong served as cinematographer, while The Teng Hwi was sound director. It was shot in black-and-white.

The film starred Lo Tjin Nio and Bissu. Bissu, known as a stage actor, made his feature film debut. Oh Iboe was advertised as containing Malay-language songs.

Release and legacy
Oh Iboe was released around 1938. It was advertised with the tagline "What is the life of child who has never seen her mother like?".

After Ob Iboe The and his Java Industrial Film produced almost twenty further films. Bissu continued to act with Java Industrial Film until the company closed in 1942; beginning with Alang-Alang (Grass) in 1939 he mostly took the role of the antagonist.

Oh Iboe is likely a lost film. The American visual anthropologist Karl G. Heider writes that all Indonesian films from before 1950 are lost. However, JB Kristanto's Katalog Film Indonesia (Indonesian Film Catalogue) records several as having survived at Sinematek Indonesia's archives, and historian Misbach Yusa Biran writes that several Japanese propaganda films have survived at the Netherlands Government Information Service.

Explanatory notes

References

Works cited

External links

Dutch East Indies films
Films directed by The Teng Chun
Indonesian black-and-white films
Indonesian drama films
1938 drama films
1938 films
1938 lost films
Lost drama films
Lost Indonesian films